Jonathan Joel Babineaux (born October 12, 1981) is a former American football defensive tackle who played all 12 seasons of his career with the Atlanta Falcons. He was drafted by the Falcons in the second round with the 59th overall pick in the 2005 NFL Draft.

High school career
Babineaux attended Lincoln High School in Port Arthur, Texas. In football, as a senior, he was the team captain of the Bumble Bees football team, and a first-team All-Conference linebacker. He also was an excellent punter, averaging 40 yards per punt. In basketball, he helped his team to be ranked the best in the state of Texas. He also participated in baseball, golf, and track and field.

College career
Babineaux attended the University of Iowa where he played from 2000–2004. He finished his collegiate career with 131 tackles (39 for losses), 19 sacks, 24 quarterback hurries, one interception, two pass deflections, four fumble recoveries, and five forced fumbles.

Professional career
Babineaux was drafted by the Atlanta Falcons in the second round with the 59th overall pick of the 2005 NFL Draft. On November 25, 2008, he signed a five-year contract extension with the Falcons. In 2009, he had nine tackles and 2.5 sacks against the Washington Redskins. He had a career-high six sacks in 2009, which led all NFL defensive tackles. In 2010, he posted 31 tackles, one interception, two forced fumbles, and one fumble recovery, which was returned for a touchdown against the Seattle Seahawks. In the 2011 season, he recorded 21 total tackles and one sack.

Babineaux started all 16 games in the 2012 season and recorded 3.5 sacks, 31 total tackles, and one interception. In the 2013 season, he recorded 42 total tackles and one sack. He signed a three-year, $9 million contract extension with the Falcons on March 11, 2014. In the 2014 season, he recorded 31 total tackles and two sacks. In the 2015 season, he recorded 30 total tackles, 1.5 sacks, and one interception. In the 2016 season, he recorded 22 total tackles.

At the end of the 2016 season, Babineaux and the Falcons reached Super Bowl LI, where they faced the New England Patriots on February 5, 2017. In the Super Bowl, he recorded one assisted tackle as the Falcons fell in a 34–28 overtime defeat. After the Super Bowl, Johnathan Babineuax retired from the NFL after a 12-year career.

Personal life
Jonathan is the older brother of former Seattle Seahawks and Tennessee Titans safety Jordan Babineaux Jonathan is also of Louisiana Creole descent.

References

External links
Atlanta Falcons bio

1981 births
American football defensive tackles
Atlanta Falcons players
Iowa Hawkeyes football players
Living people
African-American players of American football
Sportspeople from Port Arthur, Texas
Players of American football from Texas
21st-century African-American sportspeople
20th-century African-American people